The Turkey national baseball team is the national baseball team for Turkey. They are a contender for the European Baseball Championship and haven't competed in the Baseball World Cup. The Federation was created at the end of 2008 and at the beginning of 2009.

Results

European Baseball Championship

2021 European Baseball Championship Qualifier:

Belarus 31-2 Turkey (5 innings)

Switzerland 30-7 Turkey (5 innings)

Russia 24-0 Turkey (5 innings)

Slovenia 18-2 Turkey (5 innings)

European Under-23 Baseball Championship

European Under-21 Baseball Championship

European Junior Baseball Championship (U18)

European Youth Baseball Championship (U15)

European Juveniles Baseball Championship (U12)
 2009 : 9th

References

National baseball teams in Europe
National sports teams of Turkey
Baseball in Asia
Baseball in Europe